Stegomastodon ('roof breast tooth') is an extinct genus of gomphotheres, a family of proboscideans. It ranged throughout North America from the early Blancan ~4 Ma, to the early Irvingtonian (~1.2 Ma). The South American species have been synonymized with Notiomastodon platensis.

Species 
The following definite species have been described:
 S. aftoniae
 S. mirificus
 S. nebrascensis
 S. primitivus
S. waringi is considered synonymous with S. platensis. A dispute now exists over whether S. platensis should remain within the North and Central American genus Stegomastodon or should be moved over to the exclusively South American genus Notiomastodon. The genus Haplomastodon is regarded as synonymous with the South American Stegomastodon species.

Origin and evolution 
Stegomastodon is considered by some to be derived from New World populations of Gomphotherium. The number of species within the genus has varied between S. mirificus being the only valid species, to Osborn's seven species of “ascending mutations” (S. primitivus, S. successor, S. mirificus, S. chapmani, S. texanus, S. arizonae and S. aftoniae) Lucas et al., 2013 accepted 3 overlapping chronospecies S. primitivus, S. mirificus S. aftoniae.

Description 

Stegomastodon mirificus is known from NMNH 10707, a roughly 30-year-old male, of which most of the skeleton has been found. The tall, head and robust lower jaw suggest a strong vertical bite. Stegomastodon'''s molars were covered in enamel and had a complex pattern of ridges and knobbly protrusions on them, giving the creature a large chewing surface that suggests it was a grazer. During the early Irvingtonian, Stegomastodon was replaced by Mammuthus, which was presumably a more efficient grazer.

The genus lived in North America from the Zanclean of the Pliocene to the Late Pleistocene. The most recent specimens in the fossil record originate from Jalisco, Mexico and date to 28,000 BP, but this late date is over 1 million years after the last confirmed specimens.

 Taxonomy 
 
The South American Stegomastodon fossils were reassigned to Notiomastodon, though in literature the outdated genus and species names continued to be used until 2016. 

Revised taxonomy of Stegomastodon'' and other trilophodont gomphotheres according to Mothé et al., 2017:

References 

Gomphotheres
Prehistoric placental genera
Cenozoic mammals of North America
Pliocene proboscideans
Pleistocene proboscideans
Zanclean first appearances
Pleistocene genus extinctions
Fossil taxa described in 1912